Matthew Davies or Matt Davies may refer to:

 Matthew Davies (figure skater) (born 1981), English figure skater
 Matthew Davies (footballer) (born 1995), Australian-Malaysian footballer
 Matthew Davies (historian), British urban historian
 Matthew Davies (died 1615), Member of Parliament for Cardiff
 Matthew Henry Davies (1850–1912), Australian politician
 Matthew W. Davies (1882–1947), Welsh musician
 Matthew Vaughan-Davies, 1st Baron Ystwyth (1840–1935), Welsh politician
 Matthew Davies-Kreye, lead singer of the band Funeral for a Friend
 Matt Davies (cartoonist) (born 1966), British-American cartoonist and children's book author and illustrator
Matt Davies (rugby league) (born 1998), British rugby league footballer

See also 
 Matthew Davis (disambiguation)